Jonathan Harris (born September 22, 1975) is a Canadian actor and comedian from Newfoundland and Labrador. Harris is best known for his roles in the television series Murdoch Mysteries, Still Standing and Hatching, Matching and Dispatching, as well as the films Young Triffie, Moving Day, and Grown Up Movie Star.

Harris was born in Pouch Cove.

Career
Harris worked for five summers at the Rising Tide Theatre festival in Trinity Bay, Newfoundland.  As well as his television and film work, he has also performed as a comedian at the Winnipeg Comedy Festival, Just for Laughs Festival, and the Halifax Comedy Festival, as well as on the CBC Radio comedy series The Debaters.

In 2015, he began starring in the summer comedy/reality series Still Standing for CBC Television.

He co-hosted the 6th Canadian Screen Awards telecast with Emma Hunter.

Filmography

Film

Television

Other work

References

External links

1975 births
Canadian male comedians
Canadian male film actors
Canadian male television actors
Male actors from Newfoundland and Labrador
Living people
Memorial University of Newfoundland alumni
Canadian Screen Award winners
Canadian stand-up comedians
Comedians from Newfoundland and Labrador
21st-century Canadian male actors
21st-century Canadian comedians